Little Smoky is a hamlet in northwest Alberta, Canada within the Municipal District of Greenview No. 16. The hamlet is adjacent to the Little Smoky River.

Demographics 
Little Smoky recorded a population of 28 in the 1991 Census of Population conducted by Statistics Canada.

Services and amenities 
Little Smoky has a community hall, a motel, a playground, and an ice rink. The Waskahigan River Provincial Recreation Area is located across Highway 43.

Infrastructure 
The hamlet has two locally significant rural roads near it: Little Smoky Road (formerly Highway 745), which connects the hamlet to Highway 665, and Simonette Road, which connects to Forestry Trunk Road (formerly Highway 734).

The Little Smoky transfer station is located southwest of the hamlet on Range Road 221.  The Greenview Regional Landfill was built northeast of Little Smoky on the corner of Township Road 672 and Range Road 210.

See also 

List of communities in Alberta
List of hamlets in Alberta

References 

Municipal District of Greenview No. 16
Hamlets in Alberta